1QB Information Technologies, Inc. (1QBit) is a quantum computing software company, based in Vancouver, British Columbia. 1QBit was founded on December 1, 2012 and has established hardware partnerships with Microsoft, IBM, Fujitsu and D-Wave Systems.  While 1QBit develops general purpose algorithms for quantum computing hardware, the organization is primarily focused on computational finance, materials science, quantum chemistry, and the life sciences.

Technology
1QBit has divisions focused on universal quantum computing, advanced AI techniques, cloud based quantum processing, and hardware innovation.

1QBit's 1Qloud platform is focused on optimization including reformulating optimization problems into the quadratic unconstrained binary optimization (QUBO) format necessary to compute with quantum annealing processors and similar devices from organizations such as Fujitsu, D-Wave, Hitachi and NTT, while their QEMIST platform is focused on advanced materials and quantum chemistry research with universal quantum computing processors.

History
1QBit was founded as the first dedicated quantum computing software company in 2012. In 2013, 1QBit raised seed funding from US and Canadian angel investors, before closing a Series A financing round led by the Chicago Mercantile Exchange in 2014.
On August 5, 2015 the World Economic Forum announced 1QBit as a recipient of the 2015 Technology Pioneer Award recognizing 1QBit as a leader among the world's most promising technology companies. In 2017, 1QBit raised a $45M Series B financing round led by Fujitsu with participation from Allianz, Accenture, The Royal Bank of Scotland and the Chicago Mercantile Exchange. In April 2018, 1QBit joined the IBM Q Network, a global community of leading Fortune 500 companies, academic institutions, startups, and national research labs designed to explore practical applications for quantum computing.

In May 2020, 1QBit and its collaborators serving health authorities from East to West obtained support from the Digital Technology Supercluster to facilitate the clinical implementation of XrAI, the first Artificial Intelligence (AI) radiology platform to be accredited by Health Canada as a Class III Medical Device.

Locations
1QBit is headquartered in Vancouver, British Columbia, Canada.  In early 2019, 1QBit opened a hardware innovation lab at the University of Waterloo in Waterloo, Ontario.

See also
Adiabatic quantum computation
Quantum computing
Quantum simulator
Timeline of quantum computing and communication

References

External links

Companies based in Vancouver
2012 establishments in British Columbia
Software companies established in 2012
Financial software companies
Quantum information science
Software companies of Canada
Quantum programming